NFAS can mean:

 Non-Facility Associated Signalling, a Primary Rate Interface configuration whereby multiple T1 carriers share a signaling channel (or D channel).
 National Field Archery Society, a UK field archery organisation
 National Football Association of Swaziland, former name of the Eswatini Football Association
 Nuclear Field 'A' School (U.S. Navy), an introductory training academy for Electronics Technician Nuclear Power (ETN), see Electronics technician (United States Navy)

See also

NFA (disambiguation), for the singular of NFAs